Carl H. Tepper is an American politician who represents district 84 in the Texas House of Representatives. He is a Republican.

References

Living people
21st-century American politicians
Republican Party members of the Texas House of Representatives
Texas Tech University alumni